John Kudalor is a Ghanaian police General was the Inspector General of Police under the John Dramani Mahama administration. He served as acting IGP from November 2015 until 19 February 2016 when he was sworn in by President Mahama.

References

Ghanaian police officers
Ghanaian Inspector Generals of Police
Living people
Year of birth missing (living people)